The 1915 Howdenshire by-election was held on 10 February 1915.  The by-election was held due to the death of the incumbent Conservative MP, Henry Harrison-Broadley.  It was won by the Conservative candidate Stanley Jackson who was unopposed due to a War-time electoral pact.

References

1915 in England
1915 elections in the United Kingdom
By-elections to the Parliament of the United Kingdom in Yorkshire and the Humber constituencies
Unopposed by-elections to the Parliament of the United Kingdom (need citation)
1910s in Yorkshire